Eubranchus arci is a species of sea slug or nudibranch, a marine gastropod mollusc in the family Eubranchidae.

Description
The length of this marine species attains 5 mm.

Distribution
This species was described from Punta Hidalgo, Tenerife, Canary Islands.

References

 Ortea, J., 1981 Una nueva especie de Eubranchus (Mollusca: Opistobranchia) de Tenerife, Islas Canarias Revista de Biologia de la Universidad de Oviedo, 20-21(1979-1980) 169-176

Eubranchidae
Gastropods described in 1981